John Gemmell (born 6 September 1984) is a Scottish footballer who plays as a forward for Scottish League Two side Dumbarton.

Playing career

Queens Park
John began his senior career at Queens Park as a fresh-faced 17-year-old straight from the Giffnock North youth team. His time at Hampden was fruitful, with a goal record of better than 1 in 4. His powerful play quickly attracted the attention of the big boys.

Indeed, Gemmell was the top scorer in his last season with the Spiders

Partick Thistle
Gemmell was tipped as a future international player when he was signed by legendary Manager John Lambie as a 19-year-old, in one of his last acts as Partick Thistle boss, and his progress was monitored under his replacement Gerry Collins.

John was top scorer in Thistle reserves & made some appearances from the bench as Thistle struggled at the wrong end of the Scottish Premier League and he failed to score in 5 appearances in a poor side.

Hamilton Academicals
Desperate for first team football, Gemmell joined First Division Accies on a short term loan deal & saw more action in a side short of goals and falling short of promotion.

Dumbarton
Manager Paul Martin, a former Queens Park teammate, signed Gemmell for Dumbarton in January 2005 after he was allowed to leave Firhill, and he signed an 18-month contract at The Rock.

Bellshill Athletic
Gemmell had his first taste of Junior football with Bellshill Athletic. He then has another crack at senior football: electing for a stint at Cliftonhill.

Albion Rovers
Gemmell's goalscoring exploits at Bellshill attracted attention higher up the leagues, and Albion Rovers boss John "Cowboy" McCormack stumped up a four figure sum in January 2008 to bring the towering hitman to Cliftonhill, where he penned an 18-month deal.

Unsettled at the Manager's departure that summer, and keen to prove himself at a higher level, Gemmell was transfer listed at his own request at the end of the season.

Cowdenbeath
Manager Danny Lennon signed Gemmell for Cowdenbeath in the summer of 2008 on a two-year contract, and his haul of 13 goals in 35 games made him a key player for Lennon as he guided the Blue Brazil to successive promotions.

Montrose
Former Hibernian defender Steven Tweed enjoyed a summer long pursuit of Gemmell in 2009 before he finally committed himself to the club on a two-year deal.

John returned to Albion Rovers for a second spell in August 2010.

Stenhousemuir
Gemmell signed for Stenhousemuir in the summer of 2012  and he found a home in senior football at last. His strike rate of 29 goals in 50 appearances was his most prolific to date as he spoke warmly of being appreciated by supporters he had previously been heckled by when in opposition teams. His contract was not renewed by incoming Manager Scott Booth and he departed at the end of the season.

Clyde
After his third spell (an 18-month period this time) at Albion Rovers, Gemmell was signed for Clyde by Manager Barry Ferguson on 1 February 2016  as he was seeking a more physical foil for striker David Gormley. Initially signed on a short term contract until the end of the season, with a view to a longer stay, Gemmell left unhappy that summer stating that a verbal contract offer had been reneged upon, with a lesser offer on the table. On point of principle, Gemmell departed Broadwood a free agent.

Hurlford United
Gemmell joined Scottish former Junior Cup winners Hurlford United in the summer of 2016. to play under former Stranraer player Darren Henderson. His goal to game ratio was good, however off the field strife saw him seeking a move once again.

Cambuslang Rangers
After a very brief spell with Arthurlie, Gemmell joined Cambuslang Rangers.
 on 8 March 2017.

With a First Division winners medal & a Super First promotion under his belt, not to mention an amazing goalscoring ratio of 57 goals in 64 games, Gemmell departed Somervell Park by mutual consent in January 2019.

Troon
Gemmell signed for Troon on 21 January 2019, alongside his former Cambuslang Rangers team-mate David Green. Gemmell re-invented himself as a towering central defender for the remainder of the season to help the Portland Parkers through an injury crisis, before returning to lead the line as the club's main striker for season 2019/20.

Cambuslang Rangers
Gemmell returned to Cambuslang Rangers in 2021 and was named Club Captain shortly after. With injuries in defence, Gemmell had to fill in as a central defender for some games and also managed to net 17 times as he surpassed the 100 goals mark at that level of football.

Dumbarton (second spell) 
Gemmell returned to senior football in August 2022 at the age of 37, joining Scottish League Two side Dumbarton for a second spell with the club having impressed as a trialist.

References

External links
 

1984 births
Scottish footballers
Association football forwards
Dumbarton F.C. players
Queen's Park F.C. players
Partick Thistle F.C. players
Hamilton Academical F.C. players
Bellshill Athletic F.C. players
Albion Rovers F.C. players
Cowdenbeath F.C. players
Montrose F.C. players
Stenhousemuir F.C. players
Clyde F.C. players
Hurlford United F.C. players
Cambuslang Rangers F.C. players
Troon F.C. players
Scottish Football League players
Scottish Junior Football Association players
Living people
West of Scotland Football League players